1799 Koussevitzky is an asteroid of the Eos family from the outer regions of the asteroid belt, approximately  in diameter. It was discovered on 25 July 1950, by astronomers at Indiana University during the Indiana Asteroid Program at Goethe Link Observatory in Indiana, United States. The K-type asteroid has a rotation period of 6.3 hours. It was named for Russian conductor Serge Koussevitzky.

Orbit and classification 

According to several HCM-analyses by Zappalà, Mothé-Diniz, as well as Milani and Knežević, Koussevitzky is a core member the Eos family, the largest asteroid family of the outer main belt consisting of nearly 10,000 asteroids. However, in a more recent HCM-analysis by Nesvorný, Koussevitzky is a non-family asteroid from the main belt's background population.

It orbits the Sun in the outer asteroid belt at a distance of 2.7–3.4 AU once every 5 years and 3 months (1,923 days; semi-major axis of 3.03 AU). Its orbit has an eccentricity of 0.12 and an inclination of 11° with respect to the ecliptic. The body's observation arc begins with its official discovery observation at Goethe Link in July 1950.

Naming 

This minor planet was named in memory of Russian-born Serge Koussevitzky (1874–1951), long-time music director and conductor of the Boston Symphony Orchestra. The asteroid's name was proposed by astronomer Frank K. Edmondson of Indiana University on the occasion of Serge Koussevitzky's centenary of the birth on 26 July 1974. The official  was published by the Minor Planet Center on 1 January 1974.

Physical characteristics 

In the SMASS classification, Koussevitzky is a stony K-type asteroid, typical for members of the Eos family. The asteroid has also been characterized as an L-type by Pan-STARRS.

Rotation period 

In June 2013, a rotational lightcurve of Koussevitzky was obtained from photometric observations by Brian Warner at the Palmer Divide Station  in California. Lightcurve analysis gave a well-defined rotation period of  hours with a brightness variation of 0.40 magnitude. Alternative period determinations of 6.325, 6.328 and 6.329 hours were made by astronomers at the University of Iowa using its Rigel Telescope at the Iowa Robotic Observatory  in Arizona, by French amateur astronomer René Roy, and by staff members of the Palomar Transient Factory in California, respectively.

Diameter and albedo 

According to the surveys carried out by the Infrared Astronomical Satellite IRAS, the Japanese Akari satellite and the NEOWISE mission of NASA's Wide-field Infrared Survey Explorer, Koussevitzky measures between 17.88 and 23.26 kilometers in diameter and its surface has an albedo between 0.1426 and 0.241. The Collaborative Asteroid Lightcurve Link derives an albedo of 0.1506 and a diameter of 18.82 kilometers based on an absolute magnitude of 11.3.

Notes

References

External links 
 Asteroid Lightcurve Database (LCDB), query form (info )
 Dictionary of Minor Planet Names, Google books
 Asteroids and comets rotation curves, CdR – Observatoire de Genève, Raoul Behrend
 Discovery Circumstances: Numbered Minor Planets (1)-(5000) – Minor Planet Center
 
 

001799
001799
001799
Named minor planets
001799
19500725